Taos  is a town in Taos County in the north-central region of New Mexico in the Sangre de Cristo Mountains. Initially founded in 1615, it was intermittently occupied until its formal establishment in 1795 by Nuevo México Governor Fernando Chacón to act as fortified plaza and trading outpost for the neighboring Native American Taos Pueblo (the town's namesake) and Hispano communities, including Ranchos de Taos, Cañon, Taos Canyon, Ranchitos, El Prado, and Arroyo Seco. The town was incorporated in 1934. As of the 2010 census, its population was 5,716.

Taos is the county seat of Taos County. The English name Taos derives from the native Taos language meaning "(place of) red willows".

Taos is the principal town of the Taos, NM, Micropolitan Statistical Area, which includes all of Taos County.

History

Taos Pueblo

The Taos Pueblo, which borders the north boundary of the town of Taos, has been occupied for nearly a millennium. It is estimated that the pueblo was built between 1000 and 1450 A.D., with some later expansion, and the pueblo is considered to be one of the oldest continuously inhabited communities in the United States.

Located in a tributary valley off the Rio Grande, it is the most northern of the New Mexico pueblos. The pueblo, at some places five stories high, is a combination of many individual homes with common walls. There are over 1,900 Taos Puebloans living within the greater pueblo-area community. Many of them have modern homes near their fields and live there in the summer months, only staying at their homes within the main North or South pueblo buildings during cooler weather. About 150 people live within the main pueblo buildings year-round. The Taos Pueblo was added as a UNESCO World Heritage Site in 1992.

Spanish colonization
Taos was established c. 1615 as Don Fernando de Taos, following the Spanish conquest of the Indian Pueblo villages. Initially, relations of the Spanish settlers with Taos Pueblo were amicable, but resentment of meddling by missionaries, and demands by encomenderos for tribute, led to a revolt in 1640; Taos Indians killed their priest and a number of Spanish settlers and subsequently fled the pueblo, not returning until 1661.

In 1680, Taos Pueblo joined the widespread Pueblo Revolt. After the Spanish Reconquest of 1692, Taos Pueblo continued armed resistance to the Spanish until 1696, when Governor Diego de Vargas defeated the Indians at Taos Canyon.

During the 1770s, Taos was repeatedly raided by Comanches who lived on the plains of what is now eastern Colorado. Juan Bautista de Anza, governor of the Province of New Mexico, led a successful punitive expedition in 1779 against the Comanches.

Between 1780 and 1800, Don Fernando de Taos (now simply Taos) was established. Between 1796 and 1797, the Don Fernando de Taos land grant gave land to 63 Spanish families in the Taos valley. It was built as a fortified plaza with adobe buildings and is now a central plaza surrounded by residential areas. Mountain men who trapped beaver nearby made Taos their home in the early 1800s.

U.S. territory and statehood
Mexico ceded the region to the U.S. in the Treaty of Guadalupe Hidalgo in 1848 after the Mexican–American War. After the U.S. takeover of New Mexico in 1847, Hispanics and American Indians in Taos staged a rebellion, known as the Taos Revolt, in which the newly appointed U.S. Governor, Charles Bent, was killed. New Mexico was a territory of the United States beginning in 1850 and became a state in 1912.

For historical reasons, the American flag is displayed continuously at Taos Plaza (both day and night). This derives from the time of the American Civil War, when Confederate sympathizers in the area attempted to remove the flag. The Union officer Kit Carson sought to discourage this activity by having guards surround the area and fly the flag 24 hours a day.

"The Padre of Isleta", Anton Docher first served as a priest in Taos before leaving for Isleta in 1891.

Taos art colony

Beginning in 1899, artists began to settle in Taos; six formed the Taos Society of Artists in 1915. In time, the Taos art colony developed. Many paintings were made of local scenes, especially of Taos Pueblo and activities there, as the artists often modelled Native Americans from the pueblo in their paintings. Some of the artists' studios have been preserved and may be viewed by visitors to Taos. These include the Ernest L. Blumenschein House, the Eanger Irving Couse House and Studio—Joseph Henry Sharp Studios, and the Nicolai Fechin house, all of which are listed on the National Register of Historic Places.

Historic sites and tourism

Taos is home to more than twenty sites on the National Register of Historic Places.

Pueblos

Taos Fiestas
The Fiestas de Taos is an annual community celebration in the Taos Plaza honoring the feast of the two patron saints of Taos, Santa Ana and Santiago. It is normally celebrated the third weekend of July. A commemorative mass and procession from Our Lady of Guadalupe Church officially opens the event on Friday evening, followed with the crowning of the Fiestas Queen. The celebration continues with musical and dance performances scheduled on the plaza every hour. Two parades are staged, a children's parade on Saturday and the larger Fiesta Parade on Sunday.

Bent Street
Located just north of the Taos Plaza, this street was the location of Governor Charles Bent's home.

Governor Bent was scalped and killed by Pueblo warriors during the Taos Revolt on January 19, 1847. During the Taos Revolt, Bent's horses were set free from their stable.

Artists homes and studios

Present 
The Helene Wurlitzer Foundation is a non-profit organization based in Taos that provides free residency to eleven artists, with each year divided into three residency sessions of three months apiece.

Former principal trombone of the Munich Philharmonic Orchestra and seasonal Taos resident, Abbie Conant, runs a studio three blocks from the plaza. In addition to the studio having capacity to seat 60, there is also a two bedroom living space. In addition to her and her husband's own performances, the studio has hosted poetry readings, presentations and performance from local Taoseñas and fellows from the Wurlitzer Foundation.

Historic 
Many of the historic sites are homes and studios of artists, including the Mabel Dodge Luhan House, Eanger Irving Couse House and Studio—Joseph Henry Sharp Studios, the Nicolai Fechin House, the Leon Gaspard House, and the Ernest Martin Hennings House.

Doc Martin's restaurant in the historic Taos Inn was previously the office of Thomas "Doc" Martin while other parts of the inn served as his home and the birthplace of the Taos Society of Artists. On Ledoux street, just south of the Taos Plaza, is the Ernest L. Blumenschein House and Harwood House.

Other historic sites
The center of the Taos Downtown Historic District is the Taos Plaza. Just west of that is the Our Lady of Guadalupe Church. North of the Taos Plaza is the Governor Charles Bent House and the Taos Inn. Further north in Taos The Bernard Beimer House. On the southwestern edge of the Taos Historic district is La Loma Plaza Historic District. East of the plaza on Kit Carson Road is the Kit Carson House.

North of Taos is the Turley Mill and Distillery Site and the Rio Grande Gorge Bridge. Just outside Taos in Ranchitos is the Martinez Hacienda, the home turned museum of the late Padre Antonio José Martínez. South of Taos is the Ranchos de Taos Plaza with the San Francisco de Asis Mission Church.

It is believed that his ashes are buried there at the D. H. Lawrence Memorial.

Arts
There are three art museums in Taos: Harwood Museum of Art, Taos Art Museum and Millicent Rogers Museum that provide art from the Pueblo Native Americans, Taos Society of Artists and modern and contemporary artists of the Taos art colony. The town has more than 80 art galleries, and there are several houses of the Taos Society of Artists.

There are several local venues for the performing arts in Taos. The Taos Center for the Arts (TCA) draws nationally renowned and local performers at the Taos Community Auditorium. They also present independent film series. Three chamber music groups perform at TCA: Taos School of Music, Taos Chamber Music Group, and Music from Angel Fire. The Harwood Museum of Art is site of other performances and lectures. The Town of Taos Convention Center offers a venue for other local performances.

The Taos Talking Pictures Film Festival was a film festival held in the town from the mid-1990s to 2003.

Recreation
The Carson National Forest and Rio Grande del Norte National Monument provide many opportunities for recreation, such as hiking, skiing, fly fishing, horseback riding, golfing, hot air ballooning, llama trekking, rafting, and mountain biking. The South Boundary National Recreation trail, east of town in Carson National Forest, is consistently ranked the best mountain bike trail in New Mexico.

There are also numerous hot springs along the Rio Grande and in the Taos Mountains. Among them a historical site called Stage Coach, which used to double as a brothel during the times of the Old West. Nearby, the Cumbres & Toltec Scenic Railroad provides a ride through the Toltec Gorge and Rocky Mountain passes in an authentic narrow-gauge steam railroad.

In the winter, many people come to Taos to ski in the mountains. The Taos area has four ski areas – Taos Ski Valley, Red River ski area, Sipapu (ski area) and Angel Fire ski area. Other winter activities include hot air ballooning, horseback riding, snow-shoeing, cross-country skiing, ski skating, ice skating, ice fishing and snowmobiling.

Demographics

As of the 2010 census Taos had a population of 5,716. The median age was 44. The ethnic and racial composition of the population was 40.1% non-Hispanic white, 0.7% African American, 1% Asian, 5.3% Native American, 0.3% non-Hispanics reporting some other race, 5.4% reporting two or more races and 51.9% Hispanic or Latino of any race.

As of the census of 2000, there were 4,700 people, 2,067 households, and 1,157 families residing in the town. The racial makeup of the town was 68.04% White, 0.53% African American, 4.11% Native American, 0.62% Asian, 0.11% Pacific Islander, 21.66% from other races, and 4.94% from two or more races. Hispanic or Latino of any race were 54.34% of the population.

There were 2,067 households, out of which 27.5% had children under the age of 18 living with them, 34.7% were married couples living together, 16.2% had a female householder with no husband present, and 44.0% were non-families. 37.3% of all households were made up of individuals, and 12.1% had someone living alone who was 65 years of age or older. The average household size was 2.18 and the average family size was 2.87.

In the town, the population was spread out, with 23% under the age of 18, 6.6% from 18 to 24, 26.4% from 25 to 44, 27.8% from 45 to 64, and 16.2% who were 65 years of age or older. The median age was 41 years. For every 100 females, there were 85 males. For every 100 females age 18 and over, there were 81.3 males.

The median income for a household in the town was $25,016, and the median income for a family was $33,564. Males had a median income of $27,683 versus $23,326 for females. The per capita income for the town was $15,983. About 17.9% of families and 23.1% of the population were below the poverty line, including 26.8% of those under age 18 and 24.4% of those age 65 or over.

Geography and climate

Taos is located at  (36.393979, −105.576705).

Taos is located within two watersheds, categorized as subwatersheds or HUC12s in the United States.  The town is mostly located in the Outlet Rio Fernando del Taos Watershed, where its two waterbodies are rated as impaired. A coalition of local organizations are working to improve the watershed's health. The northern edge of town is within the Rio Fernando del Taos-Rio Pueblo del Taos Watershed.

Just to the west of Taos is the Rio Grande Gorge, cutting through the basalt flows of the Taos Plateau volcanic field and crossed by the Rio Grande Gorge Bridge, now a part of U.S. Route 64.

Taos has a warm-summer humid continental climate (Köppen Dfb), though it borders on a semi-arid climate (BSk) due to the low rainfall. The town is characterized by extreme diurnal variations of temperature. Even when summer days get extremely hot, nights cool off considerably.

Mud season
Dirt roads and driveways in Taos can experience a particularly bad mud season when winter weather is followed by unseasonably warm temperatures. This occurs because area soil is heavy with silt, which makes it vulnerable to frost heaving.

Education
The town's public schools operated by Taos Municipal Schools include Arroyos del Norte Elementary School, Enos García Elementary (also Taos Elementary School), Ranchos Elementary School, Taos Middle School, Taos High School and Taos Cyber Magnet School.

Charter schools include Anansi Charter School, Taos Academy (State Charter), Taos Municipal Charter School and Vista Grande High School. Also in the area are additional alternative and private schools: Chrysalis Alternative School, Sped Discipline, Yaxche Private School, Taos Christian Academy, and San Francisco De Asis School. The Bureau of Indian Education-operated Taos Day School is in nearby Taos Pueblo.

Dallas-based Southern Methodist University operates a  campus at Fort Burgwin in Taos.

Albuquerque-based University of New Mexico (UNM) operates a community campus in Taos, with eight affiliated buildings in Taos, such as the UNM Harwood Museum of Art and Taos High School where some classes are held.

The Earthship Academy (or Earthship Biotecture Academy) is offering training in Earthship design principles, construction methods and philosophy. Earthship is a particular type of sustainable architecture and design, based around solar power.

Government

The town of Taos is incorporated under the mayor-council form of government. The town was incorporated on May 7, 1934. The town seal is a logo of the town of Taos with the year of incorporation "1934" in the center, and on the outer edge, the words "Town of Taos, New Mexico".

The elective officers of the town include the mayor, four members of the governing body forming the town council, and a municipal judge. The town council is the board of finance of the town. The town manager and finance director serve as the nonvoting members to the board of finance. Key positions within the town government are town manager, appointed by the mayor, Town Attorney, Town Clerk, Town Engineer and Chief of Police.

 the town officers were:
 Mayor: Pascual Maestas; term from April 2022 to March 2026
 Town council members: Nathaniel Evans,  Marietta Fambro, Darian Fernandez, and  Corilia Ortega.

Taos is predominantly made up of Democrats; in 2008, approximately 74% of registered Taos County voters were Democrats, 13% were Republicans and about 13% identified with other parties or declined to affiliate with a party.

Transportation

Public
The RTD Chile Line, operated by the North Central Regional Transit District (NCRTD), is Taos' only public transportation system. It provides fare-free in-town service as well as seasonal service up to Taos Ski Valley. The transit system also provides paratransit service for citizens with special needs and ensures that all route buses are American Disability Act (ADA) equipped.

The RTD Taos Express promotes local tourism and provides weekend express service, for a nominal fee, from the Taos Plaza to the New Mexico Rail Runner, Santa Fe Municipal Airport, and Santa Fe transit.

The North Central Regional Transit District (NCRTD) has public transportation service into the Town from throughout Taos County and the Counties of Santa Fe, Rio Arriba and Los Alamos. The Taos region has service to Cerro, Penasco, Questa, Red River, the Rio Grande corridor and the University of New Mexico – Taos Klaur campus. At the Española Transit Center, passengers can connect to other regional routes, such as Española, Santa Fe, Los Alamos, and Northern Pueblos area. In 2003 the Regional Transit District Act was enacted, which authorized the creation of Regional Transit Districts (RTD's) in the state of New Mexico; In September, 2004, the North Central Regional RTD was the first RTD to be certified by the New Mexico Transportation Commission.

Airports
Taos Regional Airport (SKX) is under the direct supervision of the Town of Taos. The airport is located just a few miles north of the Town of Taos on U.S. Route 64 towards the Rio Grande Gorge Bridge.

Other airports in New Mexico include the Santa Fe Municipal Airport and Albuquerque International Sunport.

Media

Newspapers
El Crepusculo de la Libertad was the first Taos newspaper, which began in 1834 with the first printing press west of the Mississippi. Its successor The Taos News, which also does business as El Crepusculo, is the primary printed newspaper in Taos.

 The Taos News, a weekly online and print publication.
 Sangre de Cristo Chronicle serves Angel Fire, New Mexico, Red River, Cimarron, Eagle Nest, Taos, Las Vegas, Questa and Sipapu.
 The Santa Fe New Mexican
 Albuquerque Journal North Edition.

Online
Taos News has an online news site about Taos.

Television
There are two local cable television stations: Taos Local Television Public Access Channel 2 and Channel 22. See also List of television stations in New Mexico.

Radio
Radio stations serving Taos include:

(Several stations are located in the adjacent unincorporated suburbs of El Prado and Arroyo Seco.)

In popular culture

Taos has been featured in The Nine Lives of Elfego Baca (1960) and And Now Miguel (1966).

Country music artist Waylon Jennings sang a song titled "Taos, New Mexico" on his 1967 album Love of the Common People.

The character Deputy Marshal Sam McCloud in the 1977 television series McCloud, played by Dennis Weaver, was portrayed as being from Taos.

On September 18, 1991, the PBS television series Reading Rainbow shot its 73rd episode "The Legend of the Indian Paintbrush" here. The title was based on a book by Tomie dePaola and was narrated by Harold Littlebird (born 1951). Santa Fe's Dominic C. Arquero introduced himself at this program's beginning.

The Volkswagen Taos, introduced in October 2018, is named after the town to pay tribute to its former resident John Muir, a structural engineer who authored a Volkswagen repair book in 1969.

Taos Hum
An ongoing low-frequency noise, audible only to some, is thought to originate somewhere near this town and is consequently sometimes known as the Taos Hum. Those who have heard the Hum usually hear it west of Taos near Tres Orejas. The Taos Hum was featured in a 1995 episode of the television series Unsolved Mysteries, and it is also mentioned in a 1998 episode of The X-Files.

Sister cities
Taos has one sister city, as designated by Sister Cities International:
  Xalisco, Nayarit, Mexico

Notable people

Artists and actors

Sportspeople 
 Ross Anderson, skier
 Kit Carson, frontiersman
 Dave Hahn, mountaineer
 Danelle Umstead, Paralympic skier

Professors and medical professionals 

 Fred Wendorf, Henderson-Morrison Professor of Anthropology at Southern Methodist University
 Thomas "Doc" Martin, physician

Authors, poets, and teachers

Businesspeople and architects 

 Marcelino Baca, 19th-century fur trader
 Mabel Dodge Luhan, patron of the arts
 Susan Powter, health and fitness entrepreneur
 Mike Reynolds, Earthship architect
 Millicent Rogers, socialite, fashion icon, and art collector

Politicians 

 Daniel R. Barrone, mayor of Taos and member of the New Mexico House of Representatives
Charles Bent, first Territorial Governor of New Mexico
 Gary Johnson, former two-term governor of New Mexico
 John Márquez, politician in Richmond, California
 Kristina Ortez, politician
 Donald Rumsfeld, former Secretary of Defense of the United States (part-time resident)
 Rebecca Vigil-Giron, 20th and 22nd New Mexico Secretary of State

Religious figures 
 Antonio José Martínez, priest

Gallery

See also

 List of municipalities in New Mexico

References

Further reading

External links

 
 The Official Taos Vacation Guide, published by the Town of Taos
 Taos County Chamber of Commerce
 Taos Public Library

 

County seats in New Mexico
Micropolitan areas of New Mexico
New Mexico placenames of Native American origin
Towns in Taos County, New Mexico
Populated places established in the 1610s
Taos Revolt